The Border Network for Human Rights (BNHR) is a nonprofit organization based in El Paso, Texas, that advocates for immigration reform and human rights to create political, economic, and social conditions where every human being is equal in dignity and rights. The organization also documents cases of the abuse of immigrants at the hands of United States Government authorities. Efforts by BNHR to systematically document and report abuse of immigrants has led to fewer incidents in the El Paso area, according to the group. BNHR is working to make their approach a national model for reform. The Network had organized many events for the justice of human rights that include: (1)Hugs Not Walls; (2)Annual Abuse Documentation Campaigns; (3)Human Rights Promotors Campaigns.

About 
BNHR strengths lay in organizing and willingness to work within the system to combat human rights and civil rights abuses, and to bring about change to our broken immigration system. Cases of abuse and misconduct between United States authorities and persons subject to their authority near the border is "pervasive," according to the Immigration Policy Center. Cases have been reported that customs officers have committed acts of verbal and physical abuse at the United States-Mexico border. Cases described as "hate crimes" against illegal immigrants by the Los Angeles Times, have occurred at the border and been allegedly committed by Border Patrol agents. In addition, many agents who have committed acts of abuse against people crossing at the border are often not disciplined. The Network is participating in a nation-wide effort to push forward immigration reforms like the Texas  - Wide Reform Immigration for Texas Alliance by educating government officials on the needs of border communities. With over 1,000 families and 7,000 individuals participating each day in West Texas and Southern New Mexico the members speak from firsthand suffering under laws of United States Government and advocate for reform. As members are reaching out to be heard from the hate of the immigration policies placed on them each day.

Background 
Fernando Garcia was one of the first coordinators of the group, which was first known as the Border Rights Coalition (BRC), he is now the Founder and executive director of the Border Network for Human Rights. It was created in the early 1990s by lawyers, civil rights activists, and church groups in El Paso. The group began documenting alleged cases of abuse carried out by Border Patrol, U.S. Customs, and other immigration law enforcement agencies in the area. Border Rights Coalition was also active in protesting the treatment of immigrants, but then it transformed into Border Network for Human Rights (BNHR) in 2001. That same year BNHR had its first campaign of documentation of abuses led by members of the community and the support of attorneys in the area. After three years, held its first public event in memory of the death of Juan Patricio Pereza Quijada on February 22, 2003.

References

External links 
 Official site

Human rights organizations based in the United States
Immigrant rights organizations in the United States